Roubaix station (French: Gare de Roubaix) is a railway station serving the town Roubaix, Nord department, northern France.

Services

The station is served by high speed trains to Paris and regional trains to Lille and Kortrijk (Belgium).

References

Railway stations in Nord (French department)
Railway stations in France opened in 1888
Gare de Roubaix